We Can't Go Home Again is an experimental feature film directed by Nicholas Ray in collaboration with his film students at Binghamton University. Ray and the students play fictionalized versions of themselves.

The film was the major project of the last decade of Ray's life, and he and his collaborators continuously re-edited it. Rough versions of the film were screened at festivals as early as 1972 (including a Cannes premiere in 1973), and the most well-known cut was completed in 1976.

Ray was still making alterations to it at the time of his death in 1979.

Production 

In 1971, Nicholas Ray received an invitation to lecture at Binghamton University's Harpur College, which had at the time just established a film department. This led to Ray being offered a two-year teaching position at the department, which had been founded by Larry Gottheim and the experimental filmmaker Ken Jacobs. Ray became close with his students, and together with them moved into a house off-campus where the group formed a filmmaking commune. There they began work on We Can't Go Home Again, sharing all filmmaking duties.

The film soundtrack features the song “God Bless the Family” written by Norman Zamcheck and performed by him and Suzy Williams as the duo Stormin’ Norman & Suzy.

The film was made using a wide variety of equipment and shooting formats, including Super 8, 16mm, 35mm and a video synthesizer which had been donated to the project by Nam June Paik.

Preservation
We Can't Go Home Again was preserved by the Academy Film Archive in 2011.

References

External links 
 
 
Podcast documentary on We Can't Go Home Again
 Tom Farrell, We Can't Go Home Again, "La furia umana" (www.lafuriaumana.it), n° 3, winter 2010

1976 films
American avant-garde and experimental films
American independent films
Films directed by Nicholas Ray
Films shot in New York (state)
Films set in New York (state)
1970s English-language films
1970s American films